The Seaside Park School District is a non-operating community public school district that operated one school serving students in Kindergarten through sixth grade from Seaside Park, New Jersey, United States, until it closed at the end of the 2009-10 school year.

District officials announced in May 2010 that the school would be closing and that students would attend elementary schools in the nearby Toms River Regional Schools for grades K-6. Officials cited costs of $37,000 per student if the school remained open, versus $10,500 per student if attending the Toms River district. The shared services agreement was renewed for the 2013-2014 school year.

As of the 2008-09 school year, the district's one school had an enrollment of 71 students and 11.6 classroom teachers (on an FTE basis), for a student–teacher ratio of 6.1.

The district was classified by the New Jersey Department of Education as being in District Factor Group "DE", the fifth-highest of eight groupings. District Factor Groups organize districts statewide to allow comparison by common socioeconomic characteristics of the local districts. From lowest socioeconomic status to highest, the categories are A, B, CD, DE, FG, GH, I and J.

Public school students in seventh through twelfth grades attend the schools of the Central Regional School District, which serves students from Island Heights and from the municipalities of Berkeley Township, Ocean Gate, Seaside Heights and Seaside Park.. Schools in the district (with 2017-18 enrollment data from the National Center for Education Statistics) are 
Central Regional Middle School for grades 7 and 8 (761 students) and 
Central Regional High School for grades 9 - 12 (1,401 students). The district's Board of Education consists of nine members, who are directly elected by the residents of the constituent municipalities to three-year terms of office on a staggered basis, with three seats up for election each year. Seaside Park is allocated one of the board's nine seats.

Schools
Seaside Park Elementary School had an enrollment of 71 students in the 2008-09 school year.
Thomas Matthews, Principal

Administration
Core members of the district's / school's administration were:
Thomas Gialanella, Interim Superintendent
Barry J. Parliman, Business Administrator / Board Secretary

References

External links
Seaside Park Elementary School
 
School Data for the Seaside Park Elementary School, National Center for Education Statistics
Central Regional School District

Seaside Park, New Jersey
New Jersey District Factor Group DE
School districts in Ocean County, New Jersey
Public elementary schools in New Jersey